Kēvens (Kēvens Bendix Celestine) is an American  actor, singer and songwriter, residing in Miami, Florida. His performance history at festivals worldwide, includes the inaugural 1999 Ultra Music Festival in Miami Ultra Korea in Seoul, Korea, the Root Society Dome at Burning Man, at the Black Rock Desert, Nevada, the White Nights Festival in St. Petersburg, Russia, the One Love Fest in Takamatsu, Japan, and Earthdance Music Festival in CA, and Toyama, Japan, to name a few. 

Kēvens is an EDM pioneer, and according to Miami.com, Kēvens is "one of the first to blend a live band with electronic dance music" and name his particular style of fusion "an exceptionally unique sound." In 2001, Jane’s Addiction frontman Perry Farrell, also performing on the Zen Music Festival 2000 lineup, and was featured on the cover of MIXER magazine (the U.S. subsidiary of Mixmag)in 2001. Farrell is quoted, “…people have commented to me that the DJ Culture is drying up. I look at them and want to smack them. The only thing that it needs is to be infused with live players.” Farrell identified groups developing as "live performers". He continued, “Kevins [sic] in Miami and Roni Size too. This is where the music is heading.”

Kēvens has guested with Tom Holkenborg, aka Junkie XL, a Grammy-nominated multi-platinum producer renowned for his extensive film scoring credits. Most recently, the 2021 Zack Snyder's Justice League (Original Motion Picture Soundtrack), who in 2006, Kēvens toured with in Japan.  The highlight was performing at ageHa, in Tokyo, a venue world-renowned for its Octagon sound system. He has also performed with such acts as Damian Marley, Stephen Marley, Rabbit in the Moon, Heavyweight Dub Champion, and Liberation Movement, who described his style as "theatrical rock reggae".

History
Kēvens started in the music business in Miami as a DJ and MC. He was part of the Miami-based group Le Coup founded by Bob Marley's half brothers Richard, and Anthony Booker. Kēvens said of this early period of his career,

 Le Coup disbanded in 1997 and Kēvens continued a relationship with the Marley family occasionally performing with Stephen Marley, Damian Marley, and Julian Marley.

After his time with Le Coup ended, Kēvens moved his career towards genre-crossing explorations of rock, trip-hop, drum and bass and EDM, while maintaining his reggae foundation. He created a variety of live acts to be a feature at different festivals throughout the world.

Kēvens has released one full studio album called, We Are One (in 2010) and a variety of singles since 2000.
 In 2018, he released the single, Sweet Lady Liberty of which FSHN Magazine said "Timing couldn’t be more perfect for a new anthem that everyone can relate to and breaks down barriers in an era where hatred and divide seem more prominent than ever."

Live performances

Kēvens has emphasized his live performance throughout his career stating "What keeps me alive... is the show"  He was the first "live act" to play EDM's seminal Ultra Music Festival(UMF), and has performed at UMF in Miami 11 times, performing on the line up with such acts as Paul Oakenfold, Paul Van Dyk, and Moby. 

In 2008, Kēvens headlined North America's largest Pow-wow the Gathering of Nations in  Albuquerque, New Mexico. In 2012, a new two-day, multistage concert called the UR1 music festival was scheduled to be held in downtown Miami and coincide with Art Basel. Kēvens was scheduled to perform, bringing his unique brand of live-dubstep-reggae-rock to the main stage at UR1 to open for Kravitz and Jane’s Addiction.  

In 2013, Kēvens, alongside the Jacksons and others, participated in the White Nights Festival, an annual summer festival, and one of the most popular in St. Petersburg, Russia. The festival was broadcast throughout Russia, and the Russian territories to an estimated audience of 50 million on Channel One Russia.

In June 2018, he performed at the newer extension of the festival as part of the UMF worldwide expansion, Ultra Korea in Seoul, South Korea, and held at the 69,950 seats Seoul Olympic Stadium. This show was significant as Kēvens had the pleasure of performing for a show with 180,000 guests in Seoul, and with performances by 103 artists. Artists included Axwell & Ingrosso, Zhu, Above & Beyond, Steve Angello, and culminated with The Chainsmokers on the main stage as the closing act. 
On the Live Stage known Korean artists, Drunken Tiger, Bizzy, and Yoon Mi-rae performed, and female, South Korean rapper and singer-songwriter, CL. During the show, Kēvens was fortunate to share the stage with American Rap legend Ice Cube the headliner on the Live Stage.

Ideology

An ideological foundation plays a strong role in Kēvens' artistic presentation. He explains his perspective:
 Through his music, he "works to spread a message of peace and brotherhood that transcends all cultures". In an interview with the Sunday News in Zimbabwe, he declares “I don’t talk about religion, age and nationality because that is meant to separate and divide us." In another interview, with MIA Magazine, he states "Reggae to me is the sound of truth". He has become synonymous with the mantra "Positivity is a Necessity". Although "his elaborate stage costumes and theatrical concerts are pure 21st-century, his goal is timeless: to bring all races, cultures, and backgrounds together." 

With a strong connection to his spirituality, Kēvens is also in tune with the worlds' instability, whether political, economic, environmental, or social. During a trip to Hawaii before the COVID-19 pandemic, he found inspiration from the volcanic eruptions. He composed an environmentalist theme song, “World Is Burning,” an oratorical message about Mother Nature, and the impacts of climate change. The message he seeks to impart to viewers is to understand that we still have time to change course and secure a more sustainable and livable future.

As a long-time Florida resident, Kēvens has witnessed the environmental devastation left from hurricanes and extreme weather incidents, and how they amplify socio-economic imbalances. Drawing inspiration from tragedy, his compositions such as “Battle for Peace”, focus on such themes as gun violence and racism, whether learning of the students of Parkland who were affected by the impacts from school shootings and more recently Breonna Taylor and others. He strives to create songs that, despite their serious lyrical content, act as sources of light and hope. Additional areas he is passionate about include advocacy for those who have no voice.

Discography

Singles
 We Play Music - Felli & Buddy vs Bassbin Twins featuring MC Kēvens. (2000).
 Sunshine (Feat. Kēvens)- Milissa. (2011). Milissa. 
 My Baby Boo (Radio Mix). (2012). KTF Publishing. 
 My Baby Boo (Club Mix). (2012). KTF Publishing. 
 We’re Alive - Electrik Dread feat. Kēvens. (2014). Nine Mile Entertainment, Inc. 
 We're Alive (Riddler Remix) - Electrik Dread feat. Kēvens. (2014). Nine Mile Entertainment.
 Find Your Light. (2014). KTF Music
 Bright & Beautiful (EKTO1 Remix). (2016). KTF Music 
 Positivity (Feat. Kēvens & JLB) - DJ Short-E & LP. (2016). SoulPro Music. 
 Bright & Beautiful (feat. Kaukuta). 2016. KTF Publishing 
 All in Love (feat. Kēvens) - Hook Shop & Sly & Robbie. (2017). Michael Henry. 
 Sweet Lady Liberty (2018). KTF Music 
 Sweet Lady Liberty (Tech House Remix). (2018). KTF Music.
 I’ll Be There. (2019) KTF Music.
 World is Burning. (2020) KTF Music.
 Wine. (2020) KTF Music.
 Battle for Peace. (2020) KTF Music.

Albums
 We Are One. (2010). Rum Bum Music.

Video Games
 Dance Celebration - Bill Hamel feat. Kēvens. Dance Dance Revolution X. (2009). Konami. 
 Dance Celebration (System 7 Remix) - Bill Hamel feat. Kēvens. Dance Dance Revolution X. (2009). Konami.

Filmography

Film

Television

References

External links
 Official Site
 
 
 

American singer-songwriters
American male singer-songwriters